Stephen King Goes to the Movies is a short-story collection by Stephen King, first published on January 20, 2009. It contains five previously collected pieces of short fiction that have been adapted into films, each with a new introduction by the author.

In an appendix, King lists his ten favorite film adaptations of his work.

Stories

2009 short story collections
American short story collections
Short story collections by Stephen King
Hodder & Stoughton books